A book of remembrance is a book commemorating those who have died, usually listing their names in date or alphabetical order. They are often compiled to commemorate war dead and others who have died on military operations. Another use is to commemorate people who have been cremated or buried at a location, as an alternative to  grave markers.

Books of remembrance are often held by municipal authorities or churches and pages may be turned daily in memory of those on each page.

See also 
 Books of Remembrance (Canada)
 Condolence book
 Yizkor books

References

Commemoration
Remembrance